and  are 2019 role-playing video games developed by Game Freak and published by The Pokémon Company and Nintendo for the Nintendo Switch console. They are the first installments in the eighth generation of the Pokémon video game series and the second in the series, following Pokémon: Let's Go, Pikachu! and Let's Go, Eevee!, released on a home game console. Originally teased at E3 2017 and announced in February 2019, Pokémon Sword and Shield were released in November 2019. The games received two downloadable content expansion packs through an expansion pass with The Isle of Armor, released in June 2020 and The Crown Tundra, released in October 2020. A physical bundle including both expansion packs with the base games was released in November 2020.

Sword and Shield concept planning began immediately following the completion of Pokémon Sun and Moon in 2016, while full production began a year later in September 2017. Like previous installments, they chronicle the journey of a young Pokémon trainer aiming to become the Pokémon Champion, this time in the new Galar region, which is based on Great Britain. The main objective of the games is to dethrone the Pokémon League Champion, Leon, in a tournament that various other Gym Leaders and rivals also take part in, whilst dealing with Team Yell and a nefarious conspiracy within the League. Sword and Shield introduce 81 new Pokémon- 89 in total including later DLCs- alongside 13 regional forms of pre-existing Pokémon; Dynamaxing, which increases the size of Pokémon under certain conditions; Gigantamaxing, which additionally changes the form of certain Pokémon; and the Wild Area, which is a large, open-world area with free camera movement that contains co-op raid battles. The two games also reintroduce features previously seen in Sun and Moon and Let's Go, Pikachu! and Let's Go, Eevee!, such as regional forms and roaming Pokémon depicted in the overworld.

When the decision to not include all pre-existing Pokémon from Sword and Shield and onward was announced, it was met with backlash from a segment of the fan community, resulting in a controversy known as "Dexit" (referencing the Pokédex and Brexit) and calls for a boycott months ahead of their release. Despite this, Sword and Shield received generally positive reviews from critics. Particular praise was aimed at the creatures design, new features, and the emphasis on simplicity, player freedom, and streamlined encounters, although some criticized the game's smaller Pokédex and a perceived lack of polish or depth. By December 2022, Sword and Shield had sold more than 25.68 million copies worldwide, becoming one of the fastest-selling games on the Nintendo Switch, and are currently the fifth-best-selling games on the Switch and second-best-selling titles in the Pokémon series.

Gameplay

Pokémon Sword and Shield are role-playing video games with adventure elements and in most cases are presented in a fixed camera, third-person perspective; in certain instances free camera movement is available. The player controls a young trainer who goes on a quest to catch and train creatures known as Pokémon and win battles against other trainers. By defeating opposing Pokémon in turn-based battles, the player's Pokémon gains experience, allowing them to level up and increase their battle statistics, learn new battle techniques and in some cases, evolve into more powerful Pokémon. Players can capture wild Pokémon, found during wild encounters, by weakening them in battle and catching them with Poké Balls, allowing them to be added to their party. Players are also able to battle and trade Pokémon with other human players using the Nintendo Switch connectivity features. As with previous games in the series, certain Pokémon are only obtainable in either Sword or Shield, with players encouraged to trade with others in order to obtain all Pokémon from both versions.

Sword and Shield takes place in the Galar region, which is based on the United Kingdom. As with all regions, Galar consists of a number of cities and towns connected by "Routes"; however, there is also an open world area in the center of the region known as the "Wild Area", a concept new to the series. Random encounters with wild Pokémon may take place in tall grass or in bodies of water along routes or in the Wild Area. Wild Pokémon may also be encountered outside of tall grass and elsewhere in the environment and may chase or run away from the player depending on their disposition. The player occasionally battles Trainers in cities, towns, along routes and in the Wild Area. The driving force bringing the player to travel around the Galar region is to take part in the "Gym Challenge", an open-tournament to decide the greatest Pokémon Trainer in the region, dubbed the Champion. Eight of the game's cities and towns are homes to stadiums housing "Gym Leaders", powerful Trainers specializing in certain types of Pokémon; beating a Gym Leader gives the player a "Badge". After attaining eight Badges the player will be able to take part in the "Champion Cup", where they will face off in a single-elimination tournament against the previously faced Gym Leaders and other Trainers remaining in the Gym Challenge. After emerging victorious the player will face the Champion of the Galar region, Leon.

New features

The games introduce several new features to the series. These include cooperative raid encounters, the Wild Area, and "Dynamaxing" and "Gigantamaxing", both of which temporarily allow Pokémon to grow to larger sizes. The Wild Area is a fully explorable open world area with free camera movement and dynamic weather, which has implications on which Pokémon species appear at a given time. Gigantamaxing is limited to select Pokémon and feature different forms from the Pokémon's normal appearance and also giving the Pokémon an exclusive G-Max Move that Dynamax versions of the Pokémon cannot used. A new mechanic called "Poké Jobs" tasks the player's Pokémon with completing requests, such as assisting in construction or cooking, to gain experience or rare items. Pokémon Gyms make a return after being absent in Sun, Moon, Ultra Sun and Ultra Moon. As is typical with the series, the two games have version-exclusive content such as certain Pokémon and, for the second time, Gym Leaders. A new 'Camp' mode allows the player to interact and play with their Pokémon and cook different types of curry to provide them with bonuses. New customization options for the player character have been added, like outerwear and other accessories. In most instances, the Pokémon box can now be accessed outside of Pokémon Centers.  Like with Pokémon Sun and Moon, Pokémon previously introduced in older games, such as Weezing, gain regional Galarian Forms with new typings, stats and appearances. Some Pokémon, such as Linoone and Meowth, even gain regional evolutions, a first in the series.

Connectivity
Internet connectivity to other players is supported for functionality such as trades, battles, and encountering other trainers in the Wild Area; these functions however require a paid subscription to the Nintendo Switch Online subscription service. Sword and Shield only support direct game-to-game connectivity between themselves. The games are also compatible with Pokémon Home, an online cloud storage service for storing Pokémon, released in February 2020. Supported Pokémon can be transferred to the games from the Nintendo 3DS app Pokémon Bank, Pokémon Go and Pokémon: Let's Go, Pikachu! and Let's Go, Eevee! via Pokémon Home. Home is the only path to bringing Pokémon from previous games into Sword and Shield.

Plot

Setting

Sword and Shield take place in the Galar region, a large, narrow expanse of land and one of many regions in the Pokémon world. Game director Shigeru Ohmori described it as a more modern setting. The region itself is inspired by Great Britain, with its many landmarks resembling places such as the Houses of Parliament and the Cerne Abbas Giant. Within the Galar region lie countryside towns featuring cottages and Victorian architecture to the south. An Industrial Revolution-like city with steampunk-style elements populates the center of the region, known as Motostoke in the game, which is based on Manchester. Many of the region's towns and cities feature Pokémon Gyms stylized like football stadiums, which show off both Dynamaxing and Gigantamaxing, implemented by the Galar Pokémon League Chairman, Rose. Snow-covered mountains dominate much of the northern areas of the region. Encompassing a large portion of the south-central part of the region is the Wild Area, an open world area with numerous roaming Pokémon species. Weather across the Wild Area changes regularly.

Story

Similar to many previous entries in the Pokémon franchise, players embark on a journey across the region to become the strongest trainer, fighting eight powerful trainers called Gym Leaders and eventually the region's Champion. The player and their best friend, Hop, receive one of three starter Pokémon: Grookey, Scorbunny, or Sobble from Leon, Champion of the Galar region and Hop's older brother. Afterward, the two explore a forest called the Slumbering Weald but are driven off by a powerful Pokémon. During their subsequent visit to the region's Pokémon Professor, Magnolia and her granddaughter Sonia, they convince Leon to endorse them to take part in the Gym Challenge. After traveling to the next city to register for the Gym Challenge, they encounter rivals Bede and Marnie along with Team Yell, a devout group of hooligans who act as Marnie's unintentional fanbase and are determined to stop anyone else from completing the Challenge. The player also meets Chairman Rose, who, in addition to endorsing Bede as a Gym Challenger, presides over the Galar Pokémon League and the region's main energy company, Macro Cosmos.

As their quest continues, the player assists Sonia in her research on two Legendary Pokémon who saved Galar from an ancient crisis called the Darkest Day and deduces that they are the same Pokémon previously encountered in the Slumbering Weald. After beating the eight Gym Leaders, including Piers, Marnie's older brother and the leader of Team Yell, the player makes their way to Wyndon where they win the Champion's Cup, earning an opportunity to battle Leon. Hop and the player then head to a hotel to meet with Leon, but he does not come. With help from Piers, Marnie, and Team Yell Grunt they get the keys from Chairman Rose' guard and make their way to Rose Tower. They reach the top of Rose Tower and battle with Rose' assistant, Oleana, and find Leon who is talking to Rose. Rose reveals his intentions to trigger the Darkest Day to solve a power crisis "thousands of years in the future." Leon, Hop, and the player head home. The next day, before the battle between the player and Leon can commence, Chairman Rose awakens the legendary Pokémon Eternatus in an attempt to harness its power to provide unlimited energy to Galar, purposefully triggering a second Darkest Day. The player and Hop return to the Slumbering Weald and secure the aid of the legendary Pokémon, Zacian and Zamazenta, through a sword and shield they find in the ruins, to defeat Chairman Rose and Eternatus, after which the player catches Eternatus and Rose hands himself over to the authorities. Three days later, the player faces and defeats Leon in a battle and becomes the new Champion of the Galar region.

After defeating Leon, the player and Hop return to the Slumbering Weald to return Zacian and Zamazenta's artifacts to their rightful place. The two also meet Sonia, who has become the Galar region's new Pokémon Professor. However, they are confronted by Sordward and Shielbert, two brothers claiming to be descendants of ancient Galarian kings. The two steal one of the relics and begin forcing innocent Pokémon to Dynamax. The player, Hop, and Piers work with the Gym Leaders to subdue the Dynamax Pokémon and then track down and confront the brothers. Once both the player and Hop corners the brothers in the Hammerlocke Power Plant, they then explain why they forced many innocent Pokémon to Dynamax. They forced innocent Pokémon to Dynamax as experiments on what would happen if Zacian/Zamazenta was to be sprinkled with Galar particles. The brothers' ultimate goal is to reveal the true barbaric and brutish nature of Zacian or Zamazenta, because Sonia thought that the two heroes who stopped the Darkest Day were Pokémon rather than humans. They use Dynamax energy to drive Zamazenta (in Sword) or Zacian (in Shield) berserk, and the player drives them off with the help of Zacian (in Sword) or Zamazenta (in Shield). They then are challenged to a battle by the Legendary Pokémon and allowed to catch it, while Hop follows Zamazenta/Zacian back to the Slumbering Weald and calms it down, being chosen by it as its Trainer. The player and Hop have a final battle, after which Hop decides to be a Pokémon Professor and becomes Sonia's assistant.

Development

Development of Pokémon Sword and Shield began immediately following the completion of Sun and Moon in the months preceding their release in November 2016. Shigeru Ohmori, who previously directed Sun and Moon, formed a team who begun thinking about ideas for the title. Kazumasa Iwao, director of Pokémon Ultra Sun and Ultra Moon later joined the project as planning director and full production started in September 2017. One of the first ideas the team had was making Pokémon giant as the game could be played on a large screen, thanks to the Switch's ability to connect to a television. Ohmori then thought about having a sword and a shield Pokémon to defeat the giant Pokémon; that's how the games' titles were decided.

Approximately 1,000 people from multiple companies were involved in the development, marketing, and public relations associated with Sword and Shield. Approximately 200 Game Freak employees worked directly on the games while around 100 Creatures Inc. employees worked on 3D modeling, with an additional 100 involved in debugging and game testing. Junichi Masuda estimated the total number of people involved to be 50% greater than previous Pokémon titles.

The idea of strength and striving to be the greatest and strongest was one of the core themes that Game Freak used in designing the games. This is expressed through the Nintendo Switch's status as the most powerful console to run a Pokémon game, with features such as Dynamaxing, and references to British folklore. The games' soundtrack is inspired by British rock music. One track was composed by Toby Fox, best known for being the creator of Undertale as well as Deltarune. The Switch's ability to render larger Pokémon models and better show size differences between species is the root of the Dynamax feature. The idea of "growing and evolving" is a core concept of the games—for both the trainer and their Pokémon—stemming from producer Junichi Masuda and director Shigeru Ohmori's experience with the franchise.

"Cutting" Pokémon 
Unlike other core Pokémon games, not all existing Pokémon species appear or are usable in Sword and Shield. Masuda addressed this as a potential issue in a 2018 interview with GameSpot, at which point he said that "it does get complicated when you talk about the details and we're still figuring it out, but we do have plans to find ways to let players use their Pokémon in the next game." By 2019, Masuda explained that the sheer number of species, combined with the need to produce assets relating to new features such as the Dynamaxing system, preserve game balance, and maintain a degree of quality made it infeasible to include all existing Pokémon without extensively lengthening development time. As such, only Pokémon that appear within the Galar region are transferable from previous titles via Pokémon Home with few exceptions. Furthermore, according to the developers, the higher fidelity models, which were designed to be more "expressive," had to be built from the ground up as simply transferring existing ones produced for the 3DS platform was not possible. Masuda confirmed that all three companies involved in the development, Nintendo, Game Freak, and The Pokémon Company, agreed to cut down the games' Pokédex.

Release
The games were originally teased through a special message by The Pokémon Company president Tsunekazu Ishihara during Nintendo's E3 2017 presentation, where Ishihara mentioned that Game Freak was working on a new core series Pokémon role-playing game for Nintendo Switch but that it would not be released for more than a year. During a press conference held by The Pokémon Company in Japan on May 30, 2018, Junichi Masuda confirmed that the next Pokémon core series games would release on Switch in the second half of 2019. Ishihara also assured that the then-upcoming titles would not have influences from Pokémon Go like Let's Go, Pikachu! and Let's Go, Eevee! had and that it would introduce many new Pokémon and polished graphics.

Sword and Shield were fully unveiled in a special Nintendo Direct presentation on February 27, 2019, introducing the games' region and starter Pokémon. The presentation coincided with Pokémon Day, a fan celebration of Pokémon on the anniversary of the Japanese release of Pokémon Red and Green. A second Nintendo Direct about the games was held on June 5, 2019, which revealed some of its new features, characters, and Pokémon, including the legendary Pokémon Zacian and Zamazenta, which appear on the box art. The release date of November 15, 2019, was also announced as part of this presentation. Game Freak intentionally limited the number of new Pokémon revealed through promotional material to encourage players to discover them in-game.

A promotional crossover between Sword and Shield and Tetris 99 occurred from November 8–11, during which a limited-time unlockable theme based on the games was available. A web app was also released, allowing the viewer to explore the Wild Area online. In Super Smash Bros. Ultimate, an online tournament themed around Pokémon was held from November 15–18 to promote Sword and Shield release, while a spirit event occurred from November 22–27, with some Pokémon being available as collectible spirits.

Expansion packs

During the Pokémon Direct on January 9, 2020, a pair of expansion packs were announced which were released throughout 2020 as part of an expansion pass. The first pack, The Isle of Armor, was released on June 17, 2020, while the second pack, The Crown Tundra, was released on October 22, 2020. A physical bundle including both expansion packs with the base games was released on November 6, 2020. The expansion packs introduce new Legendary Pokémon such as Kubfu and its evolved forms in The Isle of Armor and Calyrex in The Crown Tundra, along with new regional forms for pre-existing Pokémon such as Slowpoke. Between both expansion packs, they add more than 200 pre-existing Pokémon that aren't available in the base game. The explorable area introduced in The Isle of Armor draws inspiration from the Isle of Man while the area in The Crown Tundra is based on Scotland.

Controversy
The decision not to include some pre-existing Pokémon in the games drew criticism from many fans, who referred to it as "Dexit", a portmanteau of "Pokédex" and "Brexit" (tying in with the Galar region's British theme), and used the hashtag "#BringBackNationalDex" to discuss the matter on social media. Fan backlash focused on the removal of a long-standing aspect of the franchise, the discarding of its former English tagline "gotta catch 'em all," and a perceived lack of improvements in other areas of the games, such as graphics and animations. Some fans called for the games to be delayed until all of the Pokémon could be added. In an interview with Famitsu, Shigeru Ohmori stated that models for Pokémon appearing in Sword and Shield were being made again from the ground up.

Writing for Polygon, Patricia Hernandez commented that "to some degree, the backlash makes sense" while adding that it had "gotten out of hand". Alex Donaldson of VG247 noted that feature creep—where an increase in new features over time may lead to removal of previous ones—had finally reached Pokémon, and long-overlooked design shortcomings of Game Freak were brought to the forefront as a result. Kotaku Gita Jackson summarized the backlash as "the tension of a desire to indulge in nostalgia against a desire to experience more complexity." Joe Merrick, the webmaster of fansite Serebii, considered the controversy to have caused the most unrest among Pokémon fans since the troubled launch of Pokémon Bank in 2013.

Masuda formally responded to the criticism on June 28, 2019, two weeks after it erupted, expressing appreciation for the love and passion shown by fans. He reiterated that the removal of certain Pokémon was a difficult decision to make and that they would be available in different games in the future. Michael McWhertor of Polygon noted that while Masuda's statement acknowledged the fans' discontent, it "[did not] amount to much".

After the game's release, fans who were in support of "Dexit" strongly criticized the games for its graphics, story, and characters. Further criticism came from the fact that data miners discovered that some models and animations used in the games were the same as the 3DS games, resulting in the games being review bombed on Metacritic and the hashtag #GameFreakLied being a trend on Twitter. The announcement of the Isle of Armor & Crown Tundra expansion packs drew further outrage, with some fans believing that the packs should have been free or part of the base game due to "Game Freak's actions".

Reception

Critical response

Upon release, Pokémon Sword and Pokémon Shield received "generally favorable reviews" according to review aggregator Metacritic. Critics praised the games' simplicity, new elements such as Dynamaxing, and streamlined battle encounters but criticized the incomplete Pokédex and not taking full advantage of the games' potential.

Brian Shea from Game Informer particularly praised the new Dynamax feature for being visually and strategically exciting without being overused: "while the Dynamax mechanic has the potential to disrupt the flow of any battle, it doesn't factor into most encounters, since it can only be used in Gym battles and select other situations". Casey DeFreitas for IGN also praised Sword and Shield for their fun gameplay and lack of monotonous activities, while criticizing aspects such as cutscenes and lack of a full Pokédex. Writing for GameSpot, Kallie Plagge also praised the pair for easy-to-understand game systems and a sense of freedom stating, "you're not held back by overly complicated back-end systems or hoops to jump through; from the outset, you can start wandering the Galar region, seeing its new Pokémon, and trying out its new battle strategies with very little in your way."

Conversely, Chris Tapsell for Eurogamer criticized the games, commenting that they lacked substance and did not live up to previous titles in the series. Tapsell commented "this is a new generation of Pokémon games that promises much, with brilliant new Pokémon, a raft of intricate system-tinkering for long-term fans and a series-first stab at an 'open-world' area. But all that's new seems to have come at a cost – and the cost is almost everything else in the game." James Grebey and Tom Philip of GQ also felt somewhat underwhelmed, praising the Wild Area but stating that the games were "satisfying but pedestrian" and feel like "proof of concept [with] another stage of evolution left for console Pokémon games". They also said that "there is... a lot in Sword and Shield that doesn't feel like it couldn't have been achieved on the Nintendo 3DS."

Sales
In Japan, Sword and Shield sold two million copies during their first three days on sale, surpassing Super Smash Bros. Ultimate as the fastest-selling Switch games in that region. In the US, they sold more than two million copies in their opening weekend. By November 21, 2019, Sword and Shield had sold more than six million copies worldwide, surpassing Super Smash Bros. Ultimate as the fastest-selling Switch games. By December 2022, the games had sold 25.68 million copies worldwide, and is the second-best-selling titles in the franchise, behind Pokémon Red and Blue.

Awards

Notes

References

External links
 

2019 video games
Game Freak games
Japanese role-playing video games
Multiplayer and single-player video games
Nintendo Switch games
Nintendo Switch-only games
Sword and Shield
Role-playing video games
Video game sequels
Video games about size change
Video game controversies
Video games related to anime and manga
Video games developed in Japan
Video games featuring protagonists of selectable gender
Video games set in the United Kingdom
Video games scored by Go Ichinose
Video games scored by Toby Fox
Video games with alternative versions
Video games with expansion packs
Video games with downloadable content
Video games with customizable avatars